Seminars in Reproductive Medicine is a bimonthly peer-reviewed medical review journal covering the field of reproductive medicine. It was established in 1983 as Seminars in Reproductive Endocrinology, obtaining its current name in 2000. It is published by Thieme Medical Publishers and the editors-in-chief are Richard S. Legro and James Segars. According to the Journal Citation Reports, the journal has a 2018 impact factor of 2.585.

References

External links

Thieme academic journals
Publications established in 1983
English-language journals
Reproductive health journals
Review journals